Van Linden is a surname. Notable people with the surname include:

 Alex Van Linden (born 1952), Belgian cyclist
 Rik Van Linden (born 1949), Belgian cyclist, brother of Alex

See also
 Van der Linden, another surname

Surnames of Dutch origin